Raynald Orsini was a 14th-century Italian priest: he was Archdeacon of Leicester from 1346 until his resignation in 1347.

Notes

See also
 Diocese of Lincoln
 Diocese of Peterborough
 Diocese of Leicester
 Archdeacon of Leicester

Archdeacons of Leicester
14th-century Italian Roman Catholic priests
1346 deaths